Rudolf Alexander Schröder (26 January 1878 – 22 August 1962) was a German translator and poet. In 1962 he was awarded the Johann-Heinrich-Voß-Preis für Übersetzung. He was nominated for the Nobel Prize in Literature five times.

Career
Much of his work is Christian lyrical verse. He was a member of the Confessing Church which resisted Nazi Germany. Furthermore, Schröder wrote the poem "Hymne an Deutschland" which the then president of the Federal Republic of Germany, Theodor Heuss, wanted to establish as new national anthem.

References
 

Note

External links
 

1878 births
1962 deaths
German translators
German poets
German Christians
German male poets
Recipients of the Pour le Mérite (civil class)
German male non-fiction writers
Translators of Virgil